Zambrose Abdul Rahman (18 January 1944 – 6 June 2020) was a Malaysian hurdler. He competed in the men's 400 metres hurdles at the 1968 Summer Olympics.

After his retirement, he worked as an athletics coach for the Telekom Malaysia company team.

References

1944 births
2020 deaths
Athletes (track and field) at the 1968 Summer Olympics
Malaysian male hurdlers
Olympic athletes of Malaysia
Place of birth missing
Athletes (track and field) at the 1966 Asian Games
Asian Games competitors for Malaysia